The 1997–98 USISL I-League was an American soccer league run by the United Systems of Independent Soccer Leagues during the winter of 1997 to 1998.

Regular season

Full schedule

Limited schedule

Final

MVP: David Santoro

Points leaders

Honors
 Coach of the Year:  Kevin Healey
 Defender of the Year:  Mike Barger
 Goalkeeper of the Year:  Dave Tenney

External links
The Year in American Soccer - 1998
United Soccer Leagues Statistical History, Part 3 (1997-1999)

USISL indoor seasons
United
United